Arsen Grigoryan (born 23 June 1978) is an Armenian singer and composer.

Career 
In 1995, he graduated from school No.131 after P. Yavorov in Yerevan. From 1995-2000 he studied in Hovhannes Badalyan's class at the department of Folk Music of Yerevan State Conservatory after Komitas.

In 1996, Arsen Grigoryan started his musical career by participating in singer Susanna Safaryan's concert nights. In 1997 he became the winner of Yerevan Youth Song Contest. From 1999-2004 Arsen Grigoryan worked at the Armenian State Song Theatre as a soloist. Arsen embarked on a concert tour in France, the United States, Spain, Belgium, Iran, Russia and other countries.

He has given solo concerts in Yerevan in 2002, 2006, 2008, 2009 and 2014 and in Syria in 2010.

Arsen Grigoryan has released several albums and has shot over 10 music videos. The last music video "Irarov" was published on 13 January 2022.

Arsen Grigoryan is the author of the soundtrack "Sery" (The love) of the comedy movie "Nakhachash erkusi hamar" (Breakfast for two).

In 2017, Arsen Grigoryan had his solo concert "Benefis" on Public Television of Armenia.

Arsen Grigoryan continues to have small concerts in different music halls.

Arsen Grigoryan's Studio

Grigoryan is the director of Studio, which opened on 1 September 2018. The studio's students had their first solo concert on 16 December 2019 at Hakob Paronyan State Musical Comedy Theatre. They have participated in many concerts and have got many awards. The students have several music videos, such as "Mayrik" (Մայրիկ), "Sharqayin Harutyunyan" (Շարքային Հարությունյան), "De Ergir" (Դե Երգիր), "Im Poqrik Hayastan" (Իմ փոքրիկ Հայաստան), "Mokats harsner" (Մոկաց հարսներ) and many more.

Discography

Albums 
"Batsir Achkerd" (Open Your Eyes) (2003)
"Sern E Khosum" (Love Speaks) (2006)
"Mna" (Stay) (2008)
"Yerazum" (In My Dream) (2010)
"Inch lavn es" (How good are you) (2018)

Songs 
Arsen Grigoryan's Songs 

School Students' Songs

Awards 

Song School's Awards

References 

1978 births
Living people
Armenian male singers
Armenian singer-songwriters